Yesü Möngke (died 1252) was head of the ulus of the Chagatai Khanate (1246 or 1247-1252).

Biography 
He was the fifth son of Chagatai Khan and Yesülün Khatun. In or around 1246, he was appointed as khan of the Chagatai Khanate by his cousin the Great Khan Güyük Khan, whom he was friends with, following the deposition of Qara Hülëgü. The next Great Khan, however, Möngke Khan, initiated a purge of the supporters of the house of Ögedei Khan, amongst which were the Chaghadaids. Yesü Möngke was executed by Orghana after his dismissal. Qara Hülëgü was then restored to his former position. 

He had a wife called Naishi, but he had no children. Reported to be often drunk, so that his wife and vizier Baha al-Din Marghinani was ruling in his stead.

References 

1252 deaths
Chagatai khans
13th-century monarchs in Asia
Year of birth unknown